Chimney Bluffs State Park is a  state park in the town of Huron in Wayne County, New York. The park is situated on the southern shore of Lake Ontario, east of Sodus Bay. From the park's hiking trails, visitors can view the large clay formations at the water's edge for which the park is named.

Geology

The bluffs are formed from eroded drumlins, teardrop-shaped hills of glacial till that were deposited and shaped by glaciers during the most recent ice age. The erosive power of wind, rain, snow, and waves has formed the landscape into sharp pinnacles.

Park history and features

The Chimney Bluffs area has been a landmark for many years. According to the pamphlet given by the park, smugglers used the area as a landing point while transporting liquor from Canada during Prohibition. The area was acquired by the state of New York in 1963 after having previously been operated informally as a privately owned recreation area.

It lay undeveloped until 1999 when a parking lot, service building with heated restrooms, picnic areas with grills, and hiking trails throughout the park were added. It is considered a year-round park for hiking and picnicking in the summer. Swimming is prohibited. Winter activities include cross-country skiing and snowshoeing; a trailhead for snowmobiling is also located within the park.

From some vantage points in the park, visitors can see Nine Mile Point Nuclear Generating Station,  to the northeast, as well as the coal smokestacks located in Oswego.

Gallery

See also
 List of New York state parks

References

External links
 New York State Parks: Chimney Bluffs State Park

State parks of New York (state)
Parks in Wayne County, New York